Eryxia annobioides is a species of leaf beetle from Morocco. It was first described by Spanish entomologist  in 1914.

References

Eumolpinae
Beetles of North Africa
Beetles described in 1914
Endemic fauna of Morocco